"You Got It All" is a song recorded by American band the Jets. It was released in 1986 as the fourth single from their debut studio album The Jets (1985). It was written by Rupert Holmes, most famous for the 1979 hit "Escape (The Piña Colada Song)", and produced by Don Powell (not to be confused with Slade's drummer) and David Rivkin. Holmes wrote it for his 10-year-old daughter Wendy but she never got to hear it become a hit, as prior to its release she died suddenly of an undiagnosed brain tumour. The song features the second youngest member of the group, then-13-year-old Elizabeth Wolfgramm, on lead vocals.

"You Got It All" peaked at number three on the Billboard Hot 100 in the US in early 1987. The song also topped the adult contemporary chart for two weeks, and reached number two on the R&B chart. It was also featured in the film Jaws: The Revenge as well as 1987 episodes of the daytime soap operas Another World, As the World Turns, Days of Our Lives, and General Hospital.

Background

Moana Wolfgramm and Elizabeth Wolfgramm were only aged 10 and 12 respectively when they recorded their vocals for the song, and Elizabeth had difficulty connecting with the lyrics because she was too young to grasp the romantic feelings. The manager told her to imagine she was singing it to a puppy.

Music video
The official music video was directed by Stephen E. Rivkin, the brother of song's producer, David Rivkin.

Chart performance

Weekly charts

Year-end charts

Britney Spears version

Background
In 1997, Britney Spears started to work on her debut album ...Baby One More Time. After meeting up with producer Eric Foster White in August, the singer become familiar with the original version of "You've Got It All" by the Jets and decided to record a cover of the song. Steve Lunt, Jive's A&R vice president at the time, revealed that when the label's CEO "heard [the track] in the A&R meeting, he said, 'OK, we've got something.' Up until that, it was in doubt." "You Got It All" was originally intended to be released on Spears' debut album as a bonus track, however, it was only released on certain international editions of Oops!... I Did It Again (2000) and Oops!...I Did It Again (Remixes and B-Sides) vinyl release.

Reception
A favorable review from CD Universe said, "The Jets' gem 'You've Got It All' shines brightly as ever with Britney's girlish allure. Take note, however, that Britney's not all bubbles—with an obvious influence from Mariah Carey, she glides quite ably through the key changes and delivers octave leaps and vibratos that should melt just about any heart, young or old."

Other versions
Filipino pop singer Arnee Hidalgo recorded her version of the song in 2006.
Filipino acoustic band MYMP recorded their version of the song in 2006.

Notes

References

1985 songs
1986 singles
The Jets (band) songs
Songs written by Rupert Holmes
Britney Spears songs
Jive Records singles
MCA Records singles